Virginie Mamba (born 5 December 1980) is a Congolese handball player. She plays for the club Héritage Kinshasa and is member of the DR Congo national team. She competed at the 2015 World Women's Handball Championship in Denmark.

References

1980 births
Living people
Democratic Republic of the Congo female handball players